is a Japanese female curler.

At the national level, she is a three-time Japan women's champion curler (2011, 2012, 2014).

Teams

References

External links

Kazuizawa Curling Club: Official site (in Japanese)

Living people
1989 births
Japanese female curlers
Pacific-Asian curling champions
Japanese curling champions
Continental Cup of Curling participants
20th-century Japanese women
21st-century Japanese women